Valandan (also Romanized as Valandān; also known as Valandūn) is a village in Manzariyeh Rural District, in the Central District of Shahreza County, Isfahan Province, Iran. At the 2006 census, its population was 276, in 83 families. The main families living in this village are The Mardānies, The Hemmaties and The Atāees. In old times this village used to be much more populated but during decades, most people have immigrated to other cities such as Isfahan, Abadan, Tehran and even other contries. One of the greatest Valandanians is Dr. Parviz Moin, Professor of Mechanical Engineering at Stanford University.

References 

Populated places in Shahreza County